WEGG (95.3 FM) is a radio station broadcasting an oldies format that licensed to Bowman, Georgia, United States. The station is owned by Georgia-Carolina Radiocasting Companies under licensee Lake Hartwell Radio, Inc.

On May 31, 2020, the station was sold by RFPJY, LLC to Lake Hartwell Radio, LLC, and went off the air. The sale of the station was consummated on January 19, 2021, and the call sign was changed from WYPJ to WEGG on January 21, 2021. Originally licensed to serve Due West, South Carolina, the station's community of license was moved to Bowman, Georgia effective May 25, 2021.

On August 3, 2022, WEGG launched an oldies format branded as "95.3 WEGG Good Time Oldies", carrying programming from Westwood One's Good Time Oldies network.

References

External links

EGG
Radio stations established in 2009
2009 establishments in South Carolina
Oldies radio stations in the United States